Koninklijke Academie voor Beeldende Kunsten, or Royal Academy of Visual Arts refers to a 19th-century name for one of two art schools in the Northern Netherlands:

 Rijksakademie, an old art school in Amsterdam dating back in various forms to the 18th century
 Royal Academy of Art, The Hague, an old school first founded in the 19th century as part of an artist collective there